Annadurai is a surname. Notable people with the surname include:

 C. N. Annadurai (1909–1969), Indian politician
 Mylswamy Annadurai (born 1958), Indian scientist
 R. Annadurai, Indian politician

See also
 Annadurai, a 2017 action drama film

Indian surnames